"Fuck Me Pumps" is a song by English singer and songwriter Amy Winehouse from her debut studio album, Frank (2003). Written by Winehouse and Salaam Remi, the song was released in the United Kingdom as the album's fourth and final single on 23 August 2004 under the title "Pumps"—with "Help Yourself" as its coupling track—reaching number 65 on the UK Singles Chart. A clean radio edit was released for promotional purposes.

The track is an R&B song with humorous lyrics about stereotypical "gold-digging" girls, and in general women who rely on their looks to get by. The term "fuck-me pumps" or "FMPs" is a slang expression for sexy women's shoes, particularly those featuring bare heels. Chris Willman from Entertainment picked "Fuck Me Pumps" as the best song from Frank. The music video for "Pumps" shows Winehouse walking the streets with a microphone wearing pumps (high-heeled shoes).

Personnel
Credits adapted from "Pumps / Help Yourself" CD liner notes

Songwriting – Amy Winehouse, Salaam Remi
Arranging, Producing – The Chameleon
Vocals, guitar, additional pump steps – Amy Winehouse
Electric bass, drums, beatbox – Salaam Remi
Clarinet, flute, saxophone – Vincent Henry
Electric piano – John Adams
Assistant engineering – Steve "ESP" Nowa
Mixing, recording – Gary "Mon" Noble

Track listing
UK CD single
"Pumps"
"Help Yourself"
"(There Is) No Greater Love" (AOL Session)

Charts

See also
Fuck-me shoes

References

2003 songs
2004 singles
Amy Winehouse songs
Songs written by Amy Winehouse
Songs written by Salaam Remi
Song recordings produced by Salaam Remi
Alternative hip hop songs